Fred Belcher (3 June 1881 – 18 January 1951) was an American racecar driver who competed in the first Indianapolis 500.

Indy 500 results

References

External links

1880s births
1957 deaths
Indianapolis 500 drivers
People from Chicopee, Massachusetts
Racing drivers from Massachusetts